Neosticta silvarum is a species of damselfly in the family Isostictidae,
commonly known as a forest pinfly. 
It is endemic to tropical north-eastern Queensland, Australia, where it inhabits streams in rainforest.

Neosticta silvarum is a slender, medium-sized damselfly, dull brown to black in colour with pale markings.

Gallery

See also
 List of Odonata species of Australia

References 

Isostictidae
Odonata of Australia
Insects of Australia
Endemic fauna of Australia
Taxa named by Yngve Sjöstedt
Insects described in 1917
Damselflies